The FAB 5000NG (where NG stands for its inventor, Nison Gelperin) was a 5,000 kilogram (11,000 lb) large air-dropped, thin cased, high explosive demolition bomb used by the Soviet Air Forces during World War II. The device was the most powerful aerial bomb in the wartime Soviet inventory (until the FAB-9000 demolition bomb was developed during the Cold War as part of the M-46 series).

Development
The bomb was designed by Soviet chemical engineer  (1903-1989) in 1942. Gelperin projected and built bombs with tiny metal casings, in order to reduce the use of cast iron and aluminium. In Gelperin's developments, the metal casings represented only 35 percent of the bomb's weight.

By 1942, the State Defense Committee of the Soviet Union perceived the need of weapons that could hit hard industrial and military facilities, marshaling yards and fortifications, without the usual scattering of medium-weight bombs. The first attempt came in the form of an explosive unmanned aircraft, a modified version of the TB-3, but the trials of this flying bomb were less than satisfactory.

The Directorate of Logistics of the Air Forces eventually requested to Gelperin the development of a five-ton bomb, capable of being dropped by the Pe-8, the heaviest Soviet bomber of the time. The definitive version of the FAB-5000 was fitted with six contact lateral fuses, and the warhead was filled with 3200 kg (7055 lb) of an explosive mixture of TNT, RDX, and aluminium powder. The number of fuses ensured that the force of the blast would disperse laterally, which increases the damage in areas such as industrial compounds and military facilities. In order to load the device, the bomber's bay doors had to remain half-open. The tests, however, were successful. Two bombs were dropped, one from an altitude of 4,000 m and the other from 3,300 m. Grass in a radius of 150 m was charred. Some 600 trees were torn out within a 70 m radius, while 30 percent of the trees within 135 m also fell down. The project was brought to the assembly line and the bomb was hastily put in service on 15 February 1943. By the end of the war, 98 FAB-5000s had been delivered to the Soviet Air Forces, all of them produced in 1943.

Operational use

The first combat use of the FAB-5000 took place on the night of 28 April 1943, when coastal fortifications at Königsberg were hit. The Pe-8 bomber that released the bomb from an altitude of 5,800 m was shaken by the shockwave of the explosion. On 19 July 1943, during the battle of Kursk, two Pe-8 dropped two bombs on a railroad yard near Orel, ripping apart a 100 m section of the railway and obliterating dozens of railcars and German military vehicles. Railroads and fuel depots had already been hit around Orel with one bomb on 4 June and with two bombs on 3 July. Two attacks were carried out on advancing German troops on 12 July, but further tactical use was suspended to avoid the risk of friendly fire. Soviet sources also claim that two buildings occupied by the Gestapo and the Belarusian Auxiliary Police were demolished by two FAB-5000 bombs at the city of Mogilev, Belarus, apparently on 26 May 1943. On 7 February 1944, another two FAB-5000 bombs were dropped on Helsinki, in the course of the 1944 Great Raids. Soviet sources claim that railway workshops and a cable factory were destroyed. A couple of days later, two more bombs fell on Finland's capital.

In popular culture 
 In the 2012 video game War Thunder, the FAB-5000 is included as a payload option for the Pe-8 bomber, and is portrayed as having the capacity to knock out tanks across the blast radius upwards of 100 meters.

See also 
 FAB-9000
 Tallboy
 Grand Slam
GBU-43/B MOAB

Notes

Aerial bombs of the Soviet Union
World War II weapons of the Soviet Union
Anti-fortification weapons
World War II aerial bombs
Weapons and ammunition introduced in 1943